Theodor "Turl" Brinek Jr. (May 9, 1921 – January 24, 2000) was an Austrian football player. His father, Theodor Brinek Sr., was also an Austria international footballer.

International career
He made his debut for Austria in November 1946 against Switzerland and earned 17 caps, scoring 2 goals. He was also part of Austria's squad for the football tournament at the 1948 Summer Olympics, but he did not play in any matches.

Honours
Austrian Football Bundesliga (1):
 1947
Austrian Cup (1):
 1947

References

External links
 
 Profile of Theodor Brinek Jr. 

1921 births
2000 deaths
Austrian footballers
Austria international footballers
Olympic footballers of Austria
Footballers at the 1948 Summer Olympics
AS Monaco FC players
Servette FC players
Ligue 1 players
Austrian Football Bundesliga players
Austrian expatriate footballers
Expatriate footballers in Monaco
Austrian expatriate sportspeople in Monaco
Expatriate footballers in France
Austrian expatriate sportspeople in France
Expatriate footballers in Switzerland
Austrian expatriate sportspeople in Switzerland
Austrian football managers
Servette FC managers
Association football midfielders